Manuel Fernández Anidos (born 9 May 1972 in Narón, Province of A Coruña, Galicia), commonly known as Manel, is a Spanish former footballer who played as a midfielder.

External links

Celta de Vigo biography 
Historia Racinguista profile 

1972 births
Living people
People from Narón
Sportspeople from the Province of A Coruña
Spanish footballers
Footballers from Galicia (Spain)
Association football midfielders
La Liga players
Segunda División players
Segunda División B players
Tercera División players
Celta de Vigo B players
RC Celta de Vigo players
Racing de Ferrol footballers
Elche CF players
Spain under-21 international footballers